Neven Žugaj (born April 19, 1983, in Zagreb) is a male wrestler from Croatia.

His twin brother Nenad Zugaj (younger by three minutes) also represents Croatia in wrestling. In 2016 European Wrestling Championships – Men's Greco-Roman 75 kg he lost bronze medal match to László Szabó of Hungary (2—4)

References 
 
 Official site
 
 Zagrebački blizanci izborili nastup na OI u Londonu

Living people
1983 births
Sportspeople from Zagreb
Croatian male sport wrestlers
Wrestlers at the 2012 Summer Olympics
Olympic wrestlers of Croatia
Twin sportspeople
Croatian twins
European Games competitors for Croatia
Wrestlers at the 2015 European Games
World Wrestling Championships medalists
Mediterranean Games silver medalists for Croatia
Mediterranean Games bronze medalists for Croatia
Competitors at the 2009 Mediterranean Games
Competitors at the 2013 Mediterranean Games
Mediterranean Games medalists in wrestling
20th-century Croatian people
21st-century Croatian people